The Alpi Pioneer 400 is an Italian four-seat light aircraft, designed produced by Alpi Aviation, of Pordenone. The aircraft is supplied as a kit for amateur construction or as a complete ready-to-fly-aircraft.

Design
The Alpi Pioneer series of light aircraft, 200, 300 and 400 are developments of the Vidor Champion V or Asso V, designed by Giuseppe Vidor and renamed Gamma Pioneer, of which, the Gamma Pioneer 400 is the largest seating four. Quattrocento (four hundred) is often included in the name.

The Pioneer 400 is a low wing monoplane, with a trapezoidal plan wing that has sweep only on the trailing edge and winglets at its tips. The wing structure is wooden with a single box-spar and is covered with pre-preg carbon fibre. Ailerons occupy about half the span; inboard, slotted flaps fill the rest. Both ailerons and flaps are fabric covered.

The fuselage and empennage have a wooden structure and carbon fibre skin. The engine used is the 73.5 kW (98.6 hp) Rotax 912S flat-four, driving a variable pitch propeller. The cabin is over the wings, with two pairs of side-by-side seats. Entry is by two upward-opening doors and there is a baggage space behind the rear seats. At the rear the vertical surfaces are straight-edged and swept, with a long dorsal strake. The horizontal surfaces are approximately trapezoidal in plan, with an unswept leading edge. Both the rudder and elevators are fabric covered. The rudder is balanced and both it and the port elevator carry trim tabs.

The Pioneer has retractable tricycle landing gear though the nose-wheel remains partially exposed when retracted. An emergency ballistic parachute is an option.

Development

The date of the first flight of the Pioneer 400 is not known but it first appeared in public at the 2009 Friedrichshafen airshow held 2–5 April.  Though briefly registered in Italy, by 11 June 2009 the first prototype had been re-registered in the UK as G-CGAJ.  It received type approval in late 2010 and full approval in August 2012.

Three distinct variants, each available as a kit or a flyaway aircraft, have been marketed.

Nineteen Gamma Pioneer 400s had been built by November 2014.

Variants
 Gamma Pioneer Ultralight MTOW  to Euro UL limit.
 Gamma Pioneer Experimental MTOW  to Euro Experimental limit.
 Gamma Pioneer 400T same as the Experimental, but with an uprated Rotax 914 engine.

Specification (400 Ultralight)

References

External links

2000s Italian ultralight aircraft
Homebuilt aircraft
Light-sport aircraft
Alpi Aviation aircraft
Single-engined tractor aircraft
Low-wing aircraft